The Hamar men's basketball team, commonly known as Hamar, is the men's basketball department of Íþróttafélagið Hamar. It was founded on 10 September 1992.

History
Hamar first fielded a men's team during the 1993–1994 season when it participated in 2. deild karla. After three seasons in the 2. deild, Hamar won the league in 1997 and was promoted to 1. deild karla. During its first season in 1. deild, the team finished 5th in the league. During the summer, Hamar hired former Icelandic international player Pétur Ingvarsson as its player-coach. Behind his and star player Oleg Krijanovskij play, Hamar finished fourth in the league and made it to the playoffs. In the semi-finals, Hamar defeated Þór Þorlákshöfn 2-1 and advanced to the finals where it faced former Úrvalsdeild powerhouse Íþróttafélag Reykjavíkur. After losing the first game, 102–90, Hamar went on a won the next two for the 1. deild championship and promotion to the top-tier Úrvalsdeild karla.

Trophies and achievements
Icelandic First Division (2):
1998-99, 2008–09
Icelandic Second Division (1):
1996-97

Notable players

Coaches
 Pétur Ingvarsson 1999-2007
 Ágúst Björgvinsson 2007-2011
 Lárus Jónsson 2011-2013
 Daði Steinn Arnarsson 2013-2014
 *Ari Gunnarsson 2014
 Hallgrímur Brynjólfsson 2014-2015
 Andri Þór Kristinsson 2016
 Pétur Ingvarsson 2016-2018
 Máté Dalmey 2018–2021
 Rui Costa 2021–present

References

External links
Official Website  
KKÍ: Hamar – kki.is  

Basketball teams in Iceland
Hamar (basketball)